Rocco Ríos Novo (born June 4, 2002) is a professional footballer who plays as a goalkeeper for Phoenix Rising in the USL Championship on loan from Lanús. Born in the United States, he has previously represented the Argentina national team at several youth levels.

Club career
Born in Los Angeles, California, Ríos began his career with Argentine club Lanús. On 2 March 2021, Ríos was loaned to Atlanta United 2, the reserve side of Major League Soccer club Atlanta United. On 5 April 2021, he signed a short-term contract with Atlanta United's first team before their CONCACAF Champions League match against Alajuelense.

Ríos then made his professional debut for Atlanta United in the match against Alajuelense, coming on as a late first-half substitute for Brad Guzan, who was sent off with a red card.

On 21 April 2022, Ríos was seen leaving Argentina via his Instagram story, hugging family members goodbye on a flight to Atlanta, as Atlanta United completed a deal to loan Ríos back to the club after Brad Guzan tore his Achilles earlier that week.

International career
Eligible for the United States, Mexico and Argentina. Ríos represented Argentina at several international youth levels ranging from the under-15 side to the under-16 side, including the under-17 side.

Personal life
Ríos was born to a father from Mexico and mother from Argentina.

Career statistics

Club

Honours
Argentina U15
South American U-15 Championship: 2017

Argentina U17
South American U-17 Championship: 2019

References

External links
 Profile at Atlanta United

2002 births
Living people
American soccer players
Argentine footballers
Argentine expatriate footballers
Association football goalkeepers
Club Atlético Lanús footballers
Atlanta United 2 players
Atlanta United FC players
Soccer players from Los Angeles
USL Championship players
Argentine expatriate sportspeople in the United States
Expatriate soccer players in the United States
Major League Soccer players